The Blair Years is a book by Alastair Campbell, featuring extracts from his diaries detailing the period during which he worked for Tony Blair. Published by Random House, the book was released on 9 July 2007, only two weeks after Blair stood down as Prime Minister.  As the first published major insider diary of the Blair era, many of the revelations in the book were reported on by major news organisations, including:

Blair had considered resigning as early as June 2002.
During the build-up to the Commons vote on the Iraq War, civil servants had been making contingency plans for an interim government led by Deputy Prime Minister John Prescott had Blair lost the vote.

The BBC produced a three-part series entitled "The Alastair Campbell Diaries" based on the book, which was shown on BBC Two a few days after the book was published.

Paperback published August 2008, 

The Blair Years was the winner of the Channel 4 award for Political Book of the Year in 2008.

References

External links

After Words interview with Campbell on The Blair Years, August 11, 2007

2007 non-fiction books
Books by Alastair Campbell
Tony Blair
British memoirs
Political memoirs
Books about politics of the United Kingdom
2007 in British politics
Books about prime ministers of the United Kingdom